Aowanda National Forest Recreation Area is a forest located in Ren'ai Township, Nantou County, Taiwan.

Geology
The forest spans over an area of 2,787 hectares at an altitude of 1,100-2,600 meters. It is divided into the waterfall zone, forest park, maple area and pine tree site. It is located at the back of Wanda Reservoir. It is home to more than 200 species of birds.

Facilities
The forest features a visitor center, bird watching platform and benches. Bridge in the forest is Aowanda Suspension Bridge.

Transportation
The forest is accessible by bus from Taichung TRA Station or Taichung HSR Station through Provincial Highway 14.

See also
 Geography of Taiwan

References

External links

 

Geography of Nantou County
National forest recreation areas in Taiwan
Tourist attractions in Nantou County